Alexander Kippen Galloway  (born 29 April 1952) is a British former civil servant. 

Galloway was educated at Birkenhead School, Jesus College, Oxford and the Open University. He served in the Department of the Environment, eventually as Assistant Secretary, between 1974 and 1998. In 1998 he became Clerk of the Privy Council, serving in the position until 2006. That year he was made Commander of the Royal Victorian Order. 

After leaving the Civil Service in 2006, he worked as the Clerk of the Worshipful Company of Glaziers and Painters of Glass until 2012. He has also worked as Chief Executive of the Society for the Environment and as a council member of the Institute of Directors.

References

1952 births
Living people
People educated at Birkenhead School
Alumni of Jesus College, Oxford
Alumni of the Open University
British civil servants
Clerks of the Privy Council
Commanders of the Royal Victorian Order